This is a list of speculative poets. People on this list should have articles of their own, and should meet the Wikipedia notability guidelines for their poetry. Please place names on the list only if there is a real and existing article on the poet.

See also
 Poetry
 Speculative poetry
 Speculative fiction

Lists of poets